Jiwarli (also spelt Djiwarli, Tjiwarli)  is an Australian Aboriginal language formerly spoken in the Pilbara region of Western Australia. It is a variety of the Mantharta language of the large Pama–Nyungan family. 

The last native speaker of Jiwarli, Jack Butler, died in April 1986. Prof Peter K. Austin (Linguistics Department, SOAS) collected all the available material on Jiwarli during fieldwork with Jack Butler 1978–1985. He has published a volume of texts on the language and a bilingual dictionary (Jiwarli-English with English-Jiwarli finderlist); both are currently out of print.

Phonology

Vowels

Consonants

Phonotactics
Word-initially, only non-apical stops, nasals and glides are allowed; that is, words may only begin with one of {/p k j th m ng  nh w y/}. Words may not begin with vowels.

All words end in vowels. Roots may end on a consonant, however -pa is added to all roots ending in l rl rr and -ma is added to all roots ending in a nasal that would violate the vowel-final word constraint.

References

External links
Information on the Jiwarli language and culture 

Mantharta languages
Extinct languages of Western Australia